Mississauga Centre is a federal electoral district in the Peel Region of Ontario, Canada, that has represented in the House of Commons of Canada from 1997 to 2004 and since 2015.

Geography
The riding contains the neighbourhoods of Creditview, Mavis-Erindale, Mississauga City Centre, and parts of Fairview, Mississauga Valleys, Rathwood, Erindale, East Credit and Hurontario.

History
This riding was first created in 1996 from parts of Mississauga South, Mississauga East and Mississauga West ridings. Throughout its initial existence, it was represented in the House of Commons by Carolyn Parrish. It consisted of the central part of the City of Mississauga.

The electoral district was abolished in 2003 when it was redistributed between Mississauga East—Cooksville, Mississauga South, Mississauga—Brampton South and Mississauga—Erindale ridings.

The riding was reinstated with the 2012 redistribution from parts of Mississauga East—Cooksville, Mississauga—Erindale, Mississauga—Brampton South, and Mississauga—Streetsville.

Demographics
According to the Canada 2021 Census

Ethnic groups: 30.2% South Asian, 25.0% White, 11.2% Chinese, 8.7% Arab, 6.3% Black, 6.1% Filipino, 2.9% Southeast Asian, 2.8% Latin American, 1.4% West Asian, 1.0% Korean
Languages: 35.8% English, 7.1% Arabic, 5.7% Urdu, 5.0% Mandarin, 3.5% Cantonese, 3.0% Tagalog, 2.6% Hindi, 2.4% Spanish, 2.3% Punjabi, 2.2% Polish, 2.1% Portuguese, 1.8% Tamil, 1.7% Vietnamese, 1.2% Gujarati, 1.1% Italian
Religions: 42.7% Christian (26.4% Catholic, 3.3% Christian Orthodox, 1.2% Anglican, 11.8% Other), 21.2% Muslim, 12.2% Hindu, 2.5% Buddhist, 2.5% Sikh, 18.1% No religion 
Median income: $36,400 (2020) 
Average income: $47,680 (2020)

Members of Parliament

The riding has elected the following Members of Parliament:

Election results

2015–present

1997–2000

Canadian Alliance change is from Reform

See also 
 List of Canadian federal electoral districts
 Past Canadian electoral districts

References

External links 
 Library of Parliament website

Ontario federal electoral districts
Politics of Mississauga
1996 establishments in Ontario
2003 disestablishments in Ontario
2013 establishments in Ontario